Ronald Everett Flockhart (born October 10, 1960) is a Canadian former professional ice hockey player. He is the brother of Rob Flockhart.

Playing career
Ron Flockhart scored over 300 NHL points in the 1980s playing mostly with the Philadelphia Flyers and St. Louis Blues. After an impressive season with the Regina Pats during the 1979–80 Western Hockey League season, he was signed as a free agent by the Philadelphia Flyers. While he played most of the '80–81 season with the Flyers' AHL affiliate Maine Mariners, he appeared in 14 regular season and three playoff games for the parent team. His best NHL season came the following year, as Flockhart averaged a point a game, scoring 33 goals and assisting on another 39 for 72 points. Though he enjoyed another solid year in 1982–83 with 29 goals and 60 points in 73 games, the Flyers as a team continued to have trouble advancing in the playoffs. After a slow start at the beginning of the '83–84 season, Flockhart was traded to the Pittsburgh Penguins as part of the trade that brought Rich Sutter to Philadelphia.

Flockhart spent the next two seasons playing for the Penguins and Montreal Canadiens, and in 1985–86 joined the St. Louis Blues where he tallied 22 goals and added 45 assists. It was his highest point total since his first season with the Flyers. Over the next few years, Flockhart's playing time fell with the Blues, and he ended his NHL career with a four-game stint on the Boston Bruins. Although Flockhart's NHL career was at an end, his professional career continued for a few more years with SG Cortina and Bolzano HC in Italy.

Flockhart's style was often called "Flocky (or Flockey or Flockie) Hockey" for his tendency to rag the puck rather than move it quickly up ice.

Awards
According to Gene Hart, former play-by-play television and radio commentator for the Philadelphia Flyers, Flockhart won the "Grizzly Award" each year he played for the Flyers. As recollected in his autobiography "Score: My 25 Years With the Broad Street Bullies", Hart created this "award" for the NHL player born in Smithers, BC who had the highest point total at the end of each NHL season. Hart originally coined the award as a joke between Joe Watson and his younger brother Jimmy Watson, both low scoring Flyers defencemen who were born and raised in Smithers (and at the time were the only two players from this small British Columbia town). With the emergence of Flockhart, he became a lock for the award during his NHL playing days.

Records
Holds Philadelphia Flyers record for fastest two goals (8 seconds) during a game against the St. Louis Blues on December 6, 1981.  The Flyers won the game 8–2.

Career statistics

Regular season and playoffs

Coaching
Flockhart also coached the Dallas Freeze of the Central Hockey League for 3 seasons (1992–93 through 1994–95) as well as the Reno Renegades (later called the Reno Rage) of the WCHL between 1995–96 and 1997–98.

References

External links
 
Oldtimers' Hockey Challenge player page

1960 births
Living people
Bolzano HC players
Boston Bruins players
Canadian expatriate ice hockey players in Italy
Canadian expatriate ice hockey players in the United States
Canadian ice hockey coaches
Canadian ice hockey centres
Ice hockey people from British Columbia
Maine Mariners players
Merritt Centennials players
Medicine Hat Tigers players
Montreal Canadiens players
People from Smithers, British Columbia
Peoria Rivermen (IHL) players
Philadelphia Flyers players
Pittsburgh Penguins players
Regina Pats players
SG Cortina players
St. Louis Blues players
Undrafted National Hockey League players